This page presents the results of the men's and women's volleyball tournament during the 1975 Pan American Games, which was held from October 13 to October 25, 1975, in Mexico City, Mexico.

Men's indoor tournament

Preliminary round robin

Final ranking

Women's indoor tournament

Preliminary round robin

Final ranking

References
 Men's results
 Women's results

Pan American Games
1975 Pan American Games
1975